Allur or Alluru or Alloor or Allooru may refer to:

Places in India
Alor, Bastar, a village in Kondagaon district, Chhattisgarh
Allur, Gulbargha, a village in Kalaburagi district, Karnataka
Alluru, Krishna District, a village in Krishna district, Andhra Pradesh
Allur, Nellore district, a village in Nellore district, Andhra Pradesh
Allur, Prakasam, a village in Prakasam district, Andhra Pradesh
Allur, Tiruchirappalli district, a village in Tiruchirappalli district, Tamil Nadu